In mathematics, the Wasserstein distance or Kantorovich–Rubinstein metric is a distance function defined between probability distributions on a given metric space . It is named after Leonid Vaseršteĭn.

This problem was first formalised by Gaspard Monge in 1781. Because of this analogy, the metric is known in computer science as the earth mover's distance.

The name "Wasserstein distance" was coined by R. L. Dobrushin in 1970, after learning of it in the work of Leonid Vaseršteĭn on Markov processes describing large systems of automata (Russian, 1969). However the metric was first defined by Leonid Kantorovich in The Mathematical Method of Production Planning and Organization (Russian original 1939) in the context of optimal transport planning of goods and materials. Some scholars thus encourage use of the terms "Kantorovich metric" and "Kantorovich distance". Most English-language publications use the German spelling "Wasserstein" (attributed to the name "Vaseršteĭn" being of German origin).

Definition

Let  be a metric space that is a Radon space.

That is,

Intuition and connection to optimal transport

One way to understand the above definition is to consider the optimal transport problem. That is, for a distribution of mass  on a space , we wish to transport the mass in such a way that it is transformed into the distribution  on the same space; transforming the 'pile of earth'  to the pile . Assume also that there is given some cost function

that gives the cost of transporting a unit mass from the point  to the point .
You can imagine the task as the need to move a pile of earth of shape  to the hole in the ground of shape  such that at the end, both the pile of earth and the hole in the ground completely vanish. In order for this plan to be meaningful, it must satisfy the following properties

Therefore, the total cost of a transport plan  is

The plan  is not unique; the optimal transport plan is the plan with the minimal cost out of all possible transport plans.

If the cost of a move is simply the distance between the two points, then the optimal cost is identical to the definition of the  distance.

Examples

Point masses

Deterministic distributions

Let  and  be two degenerate distributions (i.e.

Empirical distributions

One dimension

Higher dimensions

where the infimum is over all permutations  of  elements. This is a linear assignment problem, and can be solved by the Hungarian algorithm in cubic time.

Normal distributions

This result generalises the earlier example of the Wasserstein distance between two point masses (at least in the case ), since a point mass can be regarded as a normal distribution with covariance matrix equal to zero, in which case the trace term disappears and only the term involving the Euclidean distance between the means remains.

One-dimensional distributions

.

Applications

The Wasserstein metric is a natural way to compare the probability distributions of two variables X and Y, where one variable is derived from the other by small, non-uniform perturbations (random or deterministic).

In computer science, for example, the metric W1 is widely used to compare discrete distributions, e.g. the color histograms of two digital images; see earth mover's distance for more details.

In their paper 'Wasserstein GAN', Arjovsky et al. use the Wasserstein-1 metric as a way to improve the original framework of Generative Adversarial Networks (GAN), to alleviate the vanishing gradient and the mode collapse issues. The special case of normal distributions is used in a Frechet Inception Distance. 

The Wasserstein metric has a formal link with Procrustes analysis, with application to chirality measures, and to shape analysis.

In computational biology, Wasserstein metric can be used to compare between persistence diagrams of cytometry datasets.

The Wasserstein metric also has been used in inverse problems in geophysics.

The Wasserstein metric is used in Integrated information theory to compute the difference between concepts and conceptual structures.

Properties

Metric structure

It can be shown that Wp satisfies all the axioms of a metric on Pp(M). Furthermore, convergence with respect to Wp is equivalent to the usual weak convergence of measures plus convergence of the first pth moments.

Dual representation of W1
The following dual representation of W1 is a special case of the duality theorem of Kantorovich and Rubinstein (1958): when μ and ν have bounded support,

where Lip(f) denotes the minimal Lipschitz constant for f.

Compare this with the definition of the Radon metric:

If the metric d is bounded by some constant C, then

and so convergence in the Radon metric (identical to total variation convergence when M is a Polish space) implies convergence in the Wasserstein metric, but not vice versa.

Proof
The following is an intuitive proof which skips over technical points. A fully rigorous proof is found in.

Discrete case: When  is discrete, solving for the 1-Wasserstein distance is a problem in linear programming:where  is a general "cost function".

By carefully writing the above equations as matrix equations, we obtain its dual problem:and by the duality theorem of linear programming, since the primal problem is feasible and bounded, so is the dual problem, and the minimum in the first problem equals the maximum in the second problem. That is, the problem pair exhibits strong duality.

For the general case, the dual problem is found by converting sums to integrals:and the strong duality still holds.
This is the Kantorovich duality theorem. Cédric Villani recounts the following interpretation from Luis Caffarelli:
Now a shipper comes and offers to do the transport for you.

For you to accept the deal, the price schedule must satisfy . The Kantorovich duality states that the shipper can make a price schedule that makes you pay almost as much as you would ship yourself.This result can be pressed further to yield:

For notational convenience, let  denote the infimal convolution operation.   

Thus all its secants have slope .  

1D Example.

Fluid mechanics interpretation of W2 

Equivalence of W2 and a negative-order Sobolev norm

Under suitable assumptions, the Wasserstein distance  of order two is Lipschitz equivalent to a negative-order homogeneous Sobolev norm.  More precisely, if we take  to be a connected Riemannian manifold equipped with a positive measure , then we may define for  the seminorm

and for a signed measure  on  the dual norm

Separability and completeness

For any p ≥ 1, the metric space (Pp(M), Wp) is separable, and is complete if (M, d) is separable and complete.

See also 

 Hutchinson metric
 Lévy metric
 Lévy–Prokhorov metric
 Fréchet distance
 Total variation distance of probability measures
 Transportation theory
 Earth mover's distance
 Wasserstein GAN

References

Further reading

External links 
 

Measure theory
Metric geometry
Theory of probability distributions
Statistical distance